

Mollusca

Newly named bivalves

Archosauromorphs

Newly named dinosaurs

Plesiosaurs

New taxa

Synapsids

Non-mammalian

References

 
1890s in paleontology